The Unicorn is a 1978 West German drama film directed by Peter Patzak and starring Peter Vogel, Gila von Weitershausen and Christiane Rücker. It is based on the novel of the same title by Martin Walser.

Cast

References

Bibliography 
 Eric Rentschler. German Film & Literature. Routledge, 2013.

External links 
 

1978 films
1978 drama films
German drama films
West German films
1970s German-language films
Films directed by Peter Patzak
Films based on German novels
Films about writers
1970s German films